Suncity is the first extended play by American singer Khalid. It was released on October 19, 2018 by RCA Records. It was supported by the single "Better". The EP debuted at number eight on the Billboard 200.

Singles
The EP was supported by the single "Better", which was released on September 14, 2018. The song went on to reach the top ten in Australia, Belgium, New Zealand and Norway. It peaked at number 8 on the Billboard Hot 100.

A remix of "Saturday Nights" with country singer Kane Brown was released as a single on January 9, 2019. It reached the top 60 in Canada and the US.

Critical reception

At Metacritic, which assigns a normalised rating out of 100 to reviews from mainstream critics, the album has an average score of 68, based on 4 reviews, indicating "generally favorable reviews".

Track listing 
Credits adapted from Tidal.

Notes
  signifies a miscellaneous production credit
  signifies a vocal producer 
 "9.13" features narration from El Paso, Texas Mayor, Dee Margo
 "Salem's Interlude" features vocals from Salem Mitchell and Amber Perryman
 "Motion" features background vocals from Demetrius "Meech" Harmon
 "Suncity" features vocals from Rosalía

Charts

Weekly charts

Year-end charts

Certifications

References 

2018 debut EPs
Khalid (singer) albums